The Autonomous Region in Muslim Mindanao (ARMM) was the only autonomous region in the Philippines, until it was superseded by Bangsamoro; as such it is the sole region with a regional government as prescribed by the Constitution of the Philippines. In 2001, Republic Act No. 9054 was passed for the expansion of the region by including the areas which initially rejected inclusion and the provinces which were carved from them. However, only the city of Marawi and the province of Basilan, with the exception of Isabela, opted to be integrated in the region.

A special plebiscite was set on August 14, 2001.

Results

Rules
Each province, and their component cities, has their own separate plebiscite. In order for the plebiscite to be approved, a majority of the people who voted is needed, if it fails to surpass the majority of valid votes, the plebiscite is defeated in that province or city.
For provinces voted for expansion and amendments to the original organic act:
If a majority did not vote in favor, all amendments to the organic act, save for provinces and cities that voted for inclusion, are rejected.
For provinces and cities voting for inclusion:
If a majority in each city or province votes in favor, it becomes a part of the autonomous region; in case of component cities, they do not cease to be a part of their province but regional services will be under the ARMM.
If a majority in a municipality does not vote in favor of inclusion but the totals for the rest of the province are in favor it will be a part of the ARMM nevertheless.

Provinces and cities that approved expansion (for already members) and inclusion (for non-members) are highlighted:

Summary
Support from within the ARMM was overwhelmingly in favor, with all four provinces having at least 70% of those who voted in favor of expanding the region. Those which were asked for inclusion, on the other hand, were overwhelmingly opposed, with most provinces and cities having more than 90% of those who voted opposing inclusion, with the exception of Basilan (91%), which voted overwhelmingly for inclusion (its capital Isabela City voted not to be included) and Marawi (which is part of Lanao del Sur which already within the ARMM).

Expansion
Question: Do you vote in favor of the amendments to Republic Act No. 6734, the Organic Act for the Autonomous Region in Muslim Mindanao, as proposed under this Organic Act, which includes, among other things, the expansion of the area of the autonomous region?

|- style="text-align:center;"
! width=160px | Province
! width=50px | Yes
! width=30px | %
! width=50px | No
! width=30px | %
! width=50px | Total
|-style="background: #FFFFCC"
| style="text-align:left;" | Lanao del Sur|| 185,212 || 91.3 || 17,718 || 8.7 || 202,930
|-style="background: #FFFFCC"
| style="text-align:left;" | Maguindanao||  175,893 || 72.0 || 68,561 || 28.0 || 244,454
|-style="background: #FFFFCC"
| style="text-align:left;" | Sulu|| 75,320 || 86.5 || 11,711 || 13.5 || 87,031
|-style="background: #FFFFCC"
| style="text-align:left;" | Tawi-Tawi|| 44,159 || 76.8 ||13,363 || 23.2 || 57,522
|-
!colspan=5| Valid votes || 591,937
|}

Inclusion
Question: Do you vote in favor of the inclusion of your province or city in the Autonomous Region in Muslim Mindanao?

Provinces

|- style="text-align:center;"
! width=160px | Province
! width=50px | Yes
! width=30px | %
! width=50px | No
! width=30px | %
! width=50px | Total
|-style="background: #FFFFCC"
| style="text-align:left;" | Basilan|| 185,212 || 89.3 || 22,121 || 10.7 || 207,333
|-
| style="text-align:left;" | Davao del Sur || 3,074 || 2.3 || 129,695 || 97.7 || 132,769
|-
| style="text-align:left;" | Lanao del Norte|| 27,235 || 16.6 || 136,600 || 83.4 || 163,835
|-
| style="text-align:left;" | North Cotabato|| 16,603 || 9.0 || 167,531 || 91.0 || 184,134
|-
| style="text-align:left;" | Palawan|| 1,717 || 1.5 || 113,839 || 98.5 || 115,556
|-
| style="text-align:left;" | Sarangani|| 2,359 || 3.2 || 70,727 || 96.8 || 73,086
|-
| style="text-align:left;" | South Cotabato|| 2,497 || 1.9 || 129,483 || 98.1 || 131,980
|-
| style="text-align:left;" | Sultan Kudarat|| 4,782 || 4.0 || 115,571 || 96.0 || 120,353
|-
| style="text-align:left;" | Zamboanga del Norte|| 6,540 || 4.0 || 158,125 || 96.0 || 164,665
|-
| style="text-align:left;" | Zamboanga del Sur|| 4,759 || 2.8 || 163,628 || 97.2 || 168,387
|-
| style="text-align:left;" | Zamboanga Sibugay|| 6,843 || 6.6 || 96,830 || 93.4 || 103,673
|-
!colspan=5|Valid votes !! 1,565,771
|}

Cities
Question: Do you vote in favor of the inclusion of your province or city in the Autonomous Region in Muslim Mindanao?

|- style="text-align:center;"
! width=160px | Province
! width=50px | Yes
! width=30px | %
! width=50px | No
! width=30px | %
! width=50px | Total
|-
| style="text-align:left;" | Cotabato City || 9,361 || 36.8 || 16,075 || 63.2 || 25,436
|-
| style="text-align:left;" | Dapitan || 413 || 1.8 || 22,073 || 98.2 || 22,486
|-
| style="text-align:left;" | Digos || 523 || 1.7 || 30,176 || 98.3 || 30,699
|-
| style="text-align:left;" | Dipolog || 777 || 2.7 || 28,171 || 97.3 || 28,948
|-
| style="text-align:left;" | General Santos || 1,277 || 1.5 || 82,251 || 98.5 || 83,528
|-
| style="text-align:left;" | Iligan || 1,604 || 2.5 || 61,472 || 97.5 || 63,076
|-
| style="text-align:left;" | Isabela City || 3,656 || 20.0 || 14,588 || 80.0 || 18,244
|-
| style="text-align:left;" | Kidapawan || 468 || 2.1 || 21,887 || 97.9 || 22,355
|-
| style="text-align:left;" | Koronadal || 170 || 0.5 || 33,288 || 99.5 || 33,458
|-style="background: #FFFFCC"
| style="text-align:left;" | Marawi || 26,362 || 91.6 || 2,429 || 8.4 || 28,791
|-
| style="text-align:left;" | Pagadian || 636 || 2.0 || 31,846 || 98.0 || 32,482
|-
| style="text-align:left;" | Puerto Princesa || 402 || 1.1 || 35,763 || 98.9 || 36,165
|-
| style="text-align:left;" | Tacurong || 187 || 1.0 || 19,076 || 99.0 || 19,263
|-
| style="text-align:left;" | Zamboanga City || 5,849 || 4.9 || 112,735 || 95.1 || 118.564
|-
!colspan=5|Valid votes !! 563,515
|}

References
Full text of Republic Act 9054

See also
2001 Autonomous Region in Muslim Mindanao general election

Regional plebiscites in the Philippines
2001 in the Philippines
2001 referendums
2001 elections in the Philippines
Autonomy referendums
Presidency of Gloria Macapagal Arroyo
August 2001 events in the Philippines
Politics of Basilan
Politics of Davao del Sur
Politics of Lanao del Norte
Politics of Cotabato
Politics of Palawan
Politics of Sarangani
Politics of South Cotabato
Politics of Sultan Kudarat
Politics of Zamboanga del Norte
Politics of Zamboanga del Sur
Politics of Zamboanga Sibugay
Politics of Puerto Princesa
Politics of Zamboanga City
Politics of General Santos
Politics of Lanao del Sur
Politics of Maguindanao del Norte
Politics of Maguindanao del Sur
Politics of Sulu
Politics of Tawi-Tawi